The Frst (pronounced “first”) is an American indie rock musical project founded by singer and guitarist Mikei Gray in Nashville, Tennessee

in 2017. The project’s contributors consist of Gray and a rotating lineup of guest musicians, which has included Andrew Leahey, Taking Back Sunday’s touring musician Nathan Cogan, and Insane Clown Posse’s touring musician Jeff Hutchins.

Their best known song is “Tarantino” which reached #78 on the iTunes Top 100 Rock Chart and #1 at KXFM. They had two other songs on SoundCloud USA Rock charts: "Ammo” which reached #1  and “Seven Eleven” which reached #2.

History 
Before forming The Frst, Gray had worked as a touring musician for artists such as Sublime with Rome, Village People, Florida Georgia Line, and Portugal. The Man, playing in venues such as the Vans Warped Tour and the Grand Ole Opry. Gray founded The Frst in 2017, changing the spelling of the project’s name to reflect its collaborative nature and changing lineup.

The Frst released its debut single, “Another One” in 2018.

In 2019, the project also released several singles, including “Cycles,” “Seven Eleven,” “Rules,” and  “Ammo.” “Seven Eleven” reached #2 on the SoundCloud USA Rock chart and was also featured on Loudwire’s Weekly Wire. "Ammo” reached #1 on the SoundCloud USA Rock chart.

The Frst also released the singles “Pawn Shop,”  “Simulation,” and “Tarantino” in 2020. “Tarantino” reached #78 on the iTunes Top 100 Rock Chart and #1 at KXFM.  “Simulation” was released alongside the augmented reality phone app called “The Frst,” which allowed users to scan The Frst’s logo for behind-the-scenes content.

In August 2020, The Frst released its debut album, Prelude. Gray wrote and performed seven of the ten songs on Prelude by himself. The Frst also released the single “Duh'' concurrently with the album, which reached #3 on the SoundCloud USA Rock Chart.

After the release of Prelude, The Frst released the single “This Is Me Now” in 2021, which featured Universal-Island artist Kid Brunswick. It was the second collaboration between Gray and Brunswick, the first being on Brunswick’s song “Bipolar Rhapsody.”

In summer of the same year, The Frst also released the single “Small Talk.” Gray played on more than 130 instrumental and vocal tracks within the song.

The Frst has worked with mixing and mastering engineers such as Steve Hardy, James Paul Wisner, and Andy VanDette.

In January 2022, The Frst released a single with InVogue Records artist Dead Bundy, called “Pop Punk Song.”

In July 23, 2022, The Frst release a new single called Geranimo. The track features Just a Ride & Solcura.

External links 

 The Frst Official Website
 Meet The Frst
 THE FRST – Geronimo

References 

American indie rock groups
Indie rock musical groups from Tennessee
2017 establishments in Tennessee
Musical groups established in 2017